Javits  may refer to:

People
 Jacob Javits (1904–1986), American politician
 Marian Javits (1925–2017), American actress, arts patron, and wife of Jacob Javits
 Eric M. Javits (born 1931), American diplomat, nephew of Jacob Javits

Facilities and structures
 Javits Building, Manhattan building and the tallest federal building in the U.S.
 Javits Center, Manhattan convention center
 Javits Lecture Center, Stony Brook University lecture center

See also

 
 
 Javitz, surname
 Javet, surname
 Jarvis (disambiguation)